Gurp is a hamlet located in the municipality of Tremp, in Province of Lleida province, Catalonia, Spain. As of 2020, it has a population of 20.

Geography 
Gurp is located 102km north-northeast of Lleida.

References

Populated places in the Province of Lleida